is a Japanese footballer who plays as a midfielder for J2 League club Blaublitz Akita.

Club statistics
Updated to 25 November 2022.

References

External links
Profile at Ehime FC

Profile at Cerezo Osaka

1994 births
Living people
Association football people from Ibaraki Prefecture
Japanese footballers
J1 League players
J2 League players
J3 League players
Blaublitz Akita players
Cerezo Osaka players
Tokushima Vortis players
J.League U-22 Selection players
Ehime FC players
Association football midfielders